Herwig Ahrendsen (born March 1, 1948 in Husum, Schleswig-Holstein) is a former West German handball player who competed in the 1972 Summer Olympics.

In 1972 he was part of the West German team which finished sixth in the Olympic tournament. He played five matches and scored two goals.

References

1948 births
Living people
People from Husum
German male handball players
Olympic handball players of West Germany
Handball players at the 1972 Summer Olympics
Sportspeople from Schleswig-Holstein